Narayana Murthy may refer to:

 N. R. Narayana Murthy, Indian industrialist, software engineer and founder and Chairman Emeritus of Infosys Technologies Limited
 R. Narayana Murthy, Indian film actor, director and producer of Telugu films